Frank Marzullo is an AMS seal meteorologist for WXIX-TV, the Fox network affiliate in Cincinnati, Ohio.

External links
 Frank Marzullo at Fox 19
 2004 Interview with The Jambar
 Frank Leaves the Mahoning Valley - The (Youngstown) Vindicator

American television meteorologists
Living people
Year of birth missing (living people)